Thomas Reynolds (March 12, 1796 – February 9, 1844) was the chief justice of the Illinois Supreme Court as well as the seventh Governor of Missouri. A Democrat, he is notable for being one of the few American politicians to die by suicide while in office.

Early life
Thomas Reynolds was born in Bracken County, Kentucky to Nathaniel and Catherine (nee Vernon) Reynolds. He received his basic education and education in Law while in Kentucky and was admitted to the state Bar in 1817.

Reynolds moved with his family to Illinois in his early twenties, settling in the Springfield area. Despite the same last name, and similar political career paths in Illinois, contrary to other sources John Reynolds is not the brother of Thomas Reynolds. Reynolds married Eliza Ann Young on September 20, 1823 and the couple had one child, a son, Ambrose Dudley Reynolds, born in 1824.

Career
Reynolds served as Clerk for the Illinois House of Representatives from 1818 until his appointment to the Illinois Supreme Court on August 31, 1822. He remained on the high court until January 19, 1825, and served as the court's chief justice during his entire tenure. He served one term in the Illinois House of Representatives from 1826 to 1828. Failing to be reelected, Reynolds and his family moved to Missouri, settling in the Howard County town of Fayette. Thomas Reynolds established a legal practice in Fayette, and for a time also served as editor of the Boonslick Democrat newspaper. Elected to represent Howard County in the Missouri Legislature in 1832, he was quickly named Speaker of the House. In January 1837 Missouri governor Lilburn Boggs nominated Reynolds to be the circuit judge for the 2nd judicial district, a position he held until being elected Missouri's seventh governor in 1840.

As Governor
After soundly defeating John B. Clark in the 1840 gubernatorial election, Thomas Reynolds presided over a time of great expansion and growth in Missouri. The Oregon Trail, with its kick-off point in western Missouri, was booming and the economy was beginning to recover in the state and nation from the Panic of 1837. A Jacksonian Democrat and follower of Missouri Senator Thomas Hart Benton, Reynolds generally adhered to their limited-government, hard currency viewpoints. Regarding the issue of slavery Reynolds believed in each state government's right to decide the issue for itself and that abolitionists or others helping enslaved Americans escape should face life imprisonment. Under his leadership fifteen new counties were formed in Missouri. One issue that Reynolds championed perhaps the hardest was for the elimination of debtor's prisons, which the Missouri General Assembly did in February 1843. While he was governor Reynolds worked to improve voting requirements and access. A milestone in education occurred when the first class was enrolled at the University of Missouri.

Death
Despite all his success Thomas Reynolds was not a well man, either physically or mentally. For several months prior to his death Reynolds was reported in ill health and suffering from melancholia. Political opponents in Missouri's Whig party, and certain newspapers under their influence, were particularly harsh in their criticism of Reynolds, his actions and positions as governor. During breakfast on the morning of February 9, 1844 Reynolds asked a blessing, which was not usual for him. Following the meal he locked himself in his Executive Mansion office and drew the shutters closed. Some time later a passer-by heard a shot and upon investigation Reynolds was found dead at his desk with an apparently self-inflicted gunshot wound. On the governors writing table was a sealed message addressed to his friend, Colonel William G. Minor in which he said "I have labored and discharged my duties faithfully to the public, but this has not protected me from the slanders and abuse which has rendered my life a burden to me…I pray to God to forgive them and teach them more charity."

A large crowd of mourners attended Governor Reynolds's funeral and burial at Woodlawn Cemetery in Jefferson City, Missouri. Two years later a large granite shaft was erected at his gravesite. Reynolds County, Missouri was also named in his honor. Reynolds's successor, Meredith M. Marmaduke, urged the creation of a system and building for the care of the mentally ill in his 1844 message to the legislature. This helped lead to the opening of Fulton State Hospital in Fulton, Missouri in 1851.

Joseph Smith, the founder of the Mormon religion, had been in conflict with Reynolds. In a March 10, 1844 sermon, Smith taught that God had promised to give him anything he asked. He stated that he prayed to God to "deliver me out of the hands of the Governor of Missouri and if it must needs be to accomplish it to take him away[.] [T]he next news that came pouring down...was Governor Reynolds had shot himself,"

References

External links
 

1796 births
1844 deaths
1840s suicides
19th-century American judges
19th-century American politicians
American politicians who committed suicide
Democratic Party governors of Missouri
Justices of the Illinois Supreme Court
Members of the Illinois House of Representatives
Missouri state court judges
People from Bracken County, Kentucky
People from Fayette, Missouri
Speakers of the Missouri House of Representatives
Democratic Party members of the Missouri House of Representatives
Suicides by firearm in Missouri